Tatarlı (also, Tatarly) is a village and municipality in the Shamkir Rayon of Azerbaijan.  It has a population of 2,487.

References 

Populated places in Shamkir District